Admiral Gorshkov may refer to:

Sergey Gorshkov (1910–1988), Soviet admiral
Admiral Gorshkov aircraft carrier
Admiral Sergey Gorshkov class frigate
 Russian frigate Admiral Gorshkov
 Russian ship Admiral Gorshkov, a Russian navy ship name

See also

 Sergey Gorshkov (general) (1902-1993), Soviet general
 Admiral (disambiguation)
 Gorshkov